Barriers Burned Away is a 1925 American silent historical drama film directed by W.S. Van Dyke and starring Mabel Ballin, Eric Mayne, and Frank Mayo. It is set at the time of the Great Chicago Fire in 1871.

The film is loosely adapted from the 1872 novel of the same name by Edward Payson Roe.

Plot

As described in a review in a film magazine, Wayne Morgan (Mayo), an artist, learns from his mother that a valuable painting has been stolen. In order to track it down, he takes a job as a porter in the Randolph Art Shop. He eventually discovers the picture has been copied and denounces the copy as lacking inspiration, claiming the original. Mellon (Morey), who stole it, is sent to prison and Wayne gets his position as store manager. Christine Randolph (Ballin), painter of the copy, whom Wayne falls in love with, then tells him it was all a plot to get even with him. The great Chicago fire breaks out, due to Mrs. Leary’s (Craig) cow kicking over a lantern, setting fire to the barn. The whole city is destroyed, and Wayne rescues Christine who declares her real love for him.

Cast

Preservation
A print of Barriers Burned Away is located in the Cineteca Italiana in Milan.

References

Bibliography
 Munden, Kenneth White. The American Film Institute Catalog of Motion Pictures Produced in the United States, Part 1. University of California Press, 1997.

External links

 

Lobby card at Getty Images.

1925 films
1925 drama films
1920s historical drama films
American black-and-white films
American disaster films
American historical drama films
American silent feature films
Films based on American novels
Films directed by W. S. Van Dyke
Films set in 1871
Films set in Chicago
Pathé Exchange films
1920s American films
Silent American drama films